
Year 60 BC was a year of the pre-Julian Roman calendar. At the time, it was known as the Year of the Consulship of Metellus Celer and Afranius (or, less frequently, year 694 Ab urbe condita). The denomination 60 BC for this year has been used since the early medieval period, when the Anno Domini calendar era became the prevalent method in Europe for naming years.

Events 
 By place 

 Roman Republic 
 Gaius Julius Caesar suppresses an uprising and conquers all of Lusitania for Rome.
 Creation of the First Triumvirate, an informal political alliance between Julius Caesar, Pompey the Great and Marcus Licinius Crassus (or 59 BC).

 Syria 
 The Seleucid Empire comes to an end with the last two emperors being murdered on orders from Rome.

 China 
 The Han Dynasty government establishes the Protectorate of the Western Regions, the highest military position of a military commander on the Western frontier (Tarim Basin).

Births 
 Curia, wife of Quintus Lucretius Vespillo (approximate date)
 Ptolemy XIV, king (pharaoh) of Egypt (or 59 BC)
 Tryphon, Greek grammarian (approximate date)
 Daeso, emperor of Dongbuyeo

Deaths 
 Aretas III Philhellen, king of Nabatea (approximate date)
 Su Wu, Chinese diplomat and statesman (b. 140 BC)

References